Roderick Owen (born 31 January 1967) is a former Australian rules footballer who played with St Kilda, Melbourne and the Brisbane Bears in the Victorian/Australian Football League (VFL/AFL).

Owen, who had only recently turned 16 when he made his league debut for St Kilda in 1983 against North Melbourne at Arden St Oval, suffered from various injuries early in his career and missed the entire 1985 VFL season. Owen had to wait until his 17th game, in 1986, to experience a win, with St Kilda having lost the previous 16 games he had played in. A Mentone Grammar recruit, Owen kicked a career high 39 goals in 1987, the second most by a St Kilda player that year behind Tony Lockett.

After leaving St Kilda in 1990 Owen played out the season at Victorian Football Association (VFA) club Frankston, and was then traded to Melbourne for Stephen Newport. He kicked two bags of five goals for Melbourne in 1991, against Carlton and North Melbourne. After just one year at Melbourne he was traded to Brisbane for the 1992 AFL season. Owen had a particularly strong game against Fitzroy at Princes Park when he kicked eight goals and six behinds, a club record against the Lions.

Once he finished in the AFL, Owen played for Northern Territory Football League (NTFL) side Wanderers Football Club, where he was club leading goalkicker in the 1994/95 season with 39 goals, also at Broadbeach Cats Cairns, Noosa Tigers and Cheltenham Football Clubs.

In later years Owen has worked as a concreter and has had a few amateur boxing fights.

In December 2000, Owen was sentenced to nine months in prison for assault.

References

https://www.abc.net.au/news/2021-04-03/written-off-as-an-addict-afl-star-rod-owen-hiding-dark-secrets/13255584

Sources
 https://www.abc.net.au/news/2021-04-03/st-kilda-apologises-to-rod-owen-over-little-league-abuse-afl/100046586
Lee, D. & Barfoot, M. (1995) NTFL, Northern Territory Football League: Darwin. 

1967 births
St Kilda Football Club players
Melbourne Football Club players
Brisbane Bears players
Living people
People educated at Mentone Grammar School
Australian rules footballers from Victoria (Australia)
Frankston Football Club players
Wanderers Football Club players